Heuchera americana, or American alumroot (also called Coral bells or Rock geranium), is a small (under 2 ft. high and wide) evergreen perennial native to eastern and central North America in the Saxifrage family.

Characteristics

American alumroot has lobed semi-palmate green, purple, or brown leaves that may or may not be veined or marbled. Loose racemes of insignificant green to cream flowers up to 1 meter tall bloom June to August. Found naturally in rock crevices and  ledges of bluffs.

This species has become popular with horticulturists and home-gardeners. It is usually grown for its unique foliage. New varieties are introduced regularly.

Gallery

References

Further reading
 "Heuchera Americana", North Carolina Extension Gardener Plant Toolbox
 "Coral Bells, Heuchera Americana", Georgia Native Plant Society
 "Heuchera americana", Lady Bird Johnson Wildflower Center, University of Texas at Austin

americana
Medicinal plants of North America
Flora of the Great Lakes region (North America)
Flora of the North-Central United States
Flora of the Northeastern United States
Garden plants of North America
Plants described in 1753
Taxa named by Carl Linnaeus
Flora without expected TNC conservation status